Adscita geryon, the cistus forester, is a moth of the family Zygaenidae. It is found in southern and central Europe, east to Turkey. It is also present in Great Britain.

The wingspan is 20–25 mm. Adults are on wing in July in one generation per year. They feed on the nectar of Gymnadenia species. The warm habitat is dry grasslands and alpine meadows up to an altitude of 2,400 meters.

The larvae feed on Helianthemum nummularium. Young larvae mine the leaves of their host plant. They create a number of fleck mines. The opening of the mine is a slit at the side. The mines contain little or no frass. Older larvae live free on the plant. The larvae can be found from July to May of the following year.

Subspecies
Adscita geryon geryon (from the Iberian Peninsula and Britain to European Russia, the Crimea and Turkey)
Adscita geryon acutafibra Verity, 1946
Adscita geryon orientalis (Alberti, 1938)

References

Procridinae
Moths described in 1813
Moths of Europe
Moths of Asia
Articles containing video clips